HMAS Rockhampton (J203/M203), named for the city of Rockhampton, Queensland, was one of 60 Bathurst-class corvettes constructed during World War II, and one of 36 initially manned and commissioned solely by the Royal Australian Navy (RAN).

Design and construction

In 1938, the Australian Commonwealth Naval Board (ACNB) identified the need for a general purpose 'local defence vessel' capable of both anti-submarine and mine-warfare duties, while easy to construct and operate. Construction of the prototype  did not go ahead, but the plans were retained. The need for locally built 'all-rounder' vessels at the start of World War II saw the "Australian Minesweepers" (designated as such to hide their anti-submarine capability, but popularly referred to as "corvettes") approved in September 1939, with 60 constructed during the course of the war: 36 (including Rockhampton) ordered by the RAN, 20 ordered by the British Admiralty but manned and commissioned as RAN vessels, and 4 for the Royal Indian Navy.

Rockhampton had a slightly wider beam than other Bathurst class corvettes;  greater.

Rockhampton was laid down by Walkers Limited at Maryborough, Queensland on 6 November 1940, launched on 26 June 1941, and commissioned into the RAN on 21 January 1942.

Operational history
Rockhampton began her career as a convoy escort along the east coast of Australia. Following a series of Japanese submarine attacks along the east coast of Australia, a convoy system was established. Rockhampton and  escorted the first Sydney to Brisbane convoy. The corvette remained in this role until January 1944, when she began escorting convoys to and from New Guinea. She underwent refit in Sydney over April and May 1944, before returning to escort duties in New Guinea waters. Rockhampton operated in both Australian and New Guinea waters up until the end of World War II.

Following the end of the war, Rockhampton was involved in the rescue of Dutch and Indonesian prisoners-of-war and the occupation of Ambon. On 8 October 1945, the corvette carried the Sultan of Ternate on his return home. Rockhampton returned to Sydney in November 1945, where she was assigned to minesweeping duties off the east coast of Australia. She later participated in survey duties off the coast of South Australia, before returning to Sydney on 29 April 1946.

The corvette received two battle honours for her wartime service: "Pacific 1942–45" and "New Guinea 1944".

Fate
Rockhampton paid off to reserve on 5 August 1946, and was sold to Kino Shito (Australia) Pty Ltd for scrap on 6 January 1961. She departed Australia for Japan under tow by the tug Benton Maru in 1962.

Citations

References
Books

Journal and news articles

Bathurst-class corvettes of the Royal Australian Navy
Ships built in Queensland
1941 ships
World War II corvettes of Australia